Highway 102 is a highway in the Canadian province of Saskatchewan. It runs from Highway 2 (the northern part of the CanAm Highway) at La Ronge and Lac La Ronge Provincial Park to Southend, at Reindeer Lake.

Major intersections 
From south to north. The entire route is in the Northern Saskatchewan Administration District and Division No. 18.

See also 
Roads in Saskatchewan
Transportation in Saskatchewan

References

External links 
Lac La Ronge Provincial Park

102